Susuzluq is a village in the Kalbajar District of Azerbaijan.

See also 
 Explosion near the Susuzlug village

References 

Populated places in Kalbajar District